"Stranger" is a song written by Jeff Lynne and performed by the Electric Light Orchestra (ELO). 

This song first appeared on the band's 11th studio album, Secret Messages. Stranger also was the third single from the LP. 

The small quiet opening is one of the many messages that takes place in this album. A high pitched backmasked voice is heard during the opening, played in reverse the voice is actually saying "You're playing me backwards."

Cash Box called the song "a lovely McCartneyesque vocal and ballad about...a small town boy anxiously facing the rest of the world, finding his first girl, and resolving never to return."

"Recorded this in Holland, where I was looking through the eyes of a stranger."
Jeff Lynne (2001 – Secret Messages Remaster)

Chart positions

References

Electric Light Orchestra songs
Song recordings produced by Jeff Lynne
Songs written by Jeff Lynne
1983 songs
1983 singles
Jet Records singles